Ptychosperma macarthurii, commonly known as the Macarthur palm, is a species of tree in the palm family Arecaceae. Its native range is northern Cape York Peninsula in Queensland with a number of disjunct populations in the Northern Territory and New Guinea. The species has been widely planted in tropical areas and is commonly grown as an indoor plant.

Description
They are green in the younger sections of the trunk just below the crownshaft, but may be greyish lower down.

They are mid green on the upper surface and lighter below.

Flowers are grouped in sets of 3, each with one pistillate (functionally female) set between two staminate (functionally male) flowers.

Taxonomy
Ptychosperma macarthurii was originally described from a specimen collected by Thomas Reedy, a "gardener" on the Chevert Expedition of 1875 whose presence on the expedition was sponsored by Sir William Macarthur, one of the most active and influential horticulturists in Australia in the mid-to-late 19th century. Macarthur forwarded the specimen to the Veitch Nurseries in England, where Harry Veitch described the plant and asked Hermann Wendland to name it in honour of Macarthur. Wendland named it Kentia macarthurii H. Wendl. ex H.J.Veitch, but shortly after, in 1884, Joseph Dalton Hooker published it as Ptychosperma macarthurii (H.Wendl. ex H.J.Veitch) H.Wendl. ex Hook. f.. In a 1909 paper by H.J.Wigman the species was classified as Actinophloeus macarthurii Becc. ex Wigman but without any elaboration on the description. In 1935 that genus was synonymised with Ptychosperma and the former (and current) name was reinstated.

Darwin palm
The outlying populations of this species to the east and southeast of Darwin were long accepted as the separate species Ptychosperma bleeserii (known as the Darwin palm) as described in 1928 by Max Burret in the journal Repertorium Specierum Novarum Regni Vegetabilis. However in 2003 Dixon et al. published a treatment that synonymised P. bleeseri with P. macarthurii, a treatment accepted by the Australian botanist John Leslie Dowe, and subsequently published in the online Flora of Australia.

Etymolgy
The genus name Ptychosperma is derived from the Ancient Greek word ptukhḗ, meaning "a fold"; and spérma,  "seed". The species epithet macarthurii is in honour of Macarthur.

Distribution and habitat
Distribution of this species is mainly clustered in northern Cape York Peninsula, from around Silver Plains (north of Princess Charlotte Bay), north to the top of the peninsula, some Torres Strait Islands and into southern New Guinea.

There is also a small cluster of populations in the Northern Territory, on the western margins of the Adelaide River floodplains and the nearby Howard River, near Darwin.

Conservation
P. macarthurii is classified as endangered in the Northern Territory where its distribution is limited, but in Queensland it is listed as least concern.  it is not listed on the IUCN Red List.

References

External links
 See a map of observations of P. macarthurii at the Australian Virtual Herbarium. 
 Biography of Thomas Reedy at the Encyclopedia of Australian Science

macarthurii
Palms of Australia
Flora of the Northern Territory
Flora of Queensland
Flora of New Guinea
Plants described in 1879
Taxonomy articles created by Polbot
Taxobox binomials not recognized by IUCN